X12 or X-12 may refer to:
 ASC X12, the standard for the development and maintenance of Electronic Data Interchange standards for the United States
 Convair X-12, an advanced testbed for the Atlas rocket program
 X-12-ARIMA, software for seasonal adjustment of time series data
 SJ X12, a Swedish train.